The Pedra Pintada or "Painted Rock" (not to be confused with Caverna da Pedra Pintada in Pará State), is a large rock located in the state of Roraima, Brazil. It is 85 metres long, 35 metres high and 30 metres wide, and is found in the Boa Vista savanna. There are many pictograms and other archaeological evidence inscribed on the walls of the rock. 

The rock is located inside the San Marcos indigenous area, where Macuxi, Wapishana and Pemon indigenous peoples live.

Archaeology 
During a study and excavations taking place between 1985 and 1987, Brazilian archaeologists came to the conclusion that the site has been inhabited since 2000 BC. 

They classified the rock art with two different styles: the abstract “Parime” and “Surumu”. “Surumu” style is similar to the Aishalton style of Caribbean Islands and the north of South America.

Notes

External links
 Integrated Roraima Museum celebrates 25 years
 Painted Stone can start the process of listing (in Portuguese)
 (pdf) Pedra Pintada, RR Ícone do Lago Parime (in Portuguese)

Archaeological sites in Brazil
Indigenous topics of the Amazon
Paleo-Indian period
Paleo-Indian archaeological sites in Brazil